Horst Hoeck (19 May 1904 – 12 April 1969) was a German rower who competed in the 1928 Summer Olympics and in the 1932 Summer Olympics.

In 1928 he and his partner Gerhard Voigt placed fourth after being eliminated in the quarter-finals of the double sculls event.

Four years later he won the gold medal as member of the German boat in the coxed fours competition.

External links
 profile

1904 births
1969 deaths
Olympic rowers of Germany
Rowers at the 1928 Summer Olympics
Rowers at the 1932 Summer Olympics
Olympic gold medalists for Germany
Olympic medalists in rowing
German male rowers
Medalists at the 1932 Summer Olympics